Kerala State Co-operative Bank Limited, branded as Kerala Bank, is a co-operative bank set up by the Government of Kerala, India.

History 
The bank was established in 2019 by amalgamating 13  District co-operative banks in Kerala with the Kerala State Co-operative Bank.

With the issuance of a notification establishing the Kerala State Co-operative Bank, the bank started functioning from 29 November 2019 onwards. The bank was formally launched by Pinarayi Vijayan, Chief Minister of Kerala, in a function held in Thiruvananthapuram on 6 December 2019.

Among the 14 District Co-operative Banks functioning in Kerala at the time of the formation of Kerala State Co-operative Bank, only the Malappuram District Co-operative Bank Ltd had opposed merger with the Kerala State Co-operative Bank. Also, the Kerala High Court has issued a stay order on the Kerala State Government's move to merge the Malappuram District Co-operative Bank with the Kerala State Co-operative Bank. In addition to the 14 district co-operative banks, Kerala has a  network of 1,692 Primary Agricultural Credit Societies (PACS's) and 16 licensed Urban Co-operative Banks all of which have become members/shareholders of Kerala State Co-operative Bank.

Management
The Primary Agricultural Credit Societies (PACS's) and Urban Co-operative Banks (UCB's) are designated as the 'A' Class Members of the Kerala State Co-operative Bank. The supreme authority of the bank is the General Body. The General Body consists of delegates of 'A' Class Members, ex-officio Directors and Directors nominated by the Government. The management of the bank is vested in the Board of Directors subject to the overall control of the General Body. The Board of Directors consist of twenty-one members of whom fifteen are elected by the 'A' Class Members of the Bank.

Rajan P. S. is the first Chief Executive Officer and Mini Antony IAS, the first Administrator of the Kerala State Co-operative Bank.The President of Kerala Bank is Gopi Kottamurikkal and Vice-President is MK Kannan.

Structure
The headquarters of the Kerala Bank is in Thiruvananthapuram and the corporate office is based in Kochi. The Bank has seven regional offices created by merging two District Co-operative Banks to handle businesses of two districts each. The regional offices are in Thiruvananthapuram (along with Kollam), Alappuzha (along with Pathanamthitta), Kottayam (along with Idukki), Thrissur (along with Ernakulam), Palakkad (along with Malappuram), Kozhikode (along with Wayanad) and Kannur (along with Kasaragod).

History
The origins of the Kerala State Co-operative Bank, which, with the amalgamation of 13 District Co-operative Banks, has been transformed as the Kerala Bank, can be traced to early 20th century. It was in the year 1914, "The Travancore Co-operative Societies Regulation Act" was promulgated and the first co-operative bank, "Trivandrum Central Co-operative Bank", was set up under the Act. The Travancore Central Co-operative Bank metamorphosed into Kerala State Co-operative Bank in 1956 when the state of Kerala was formed after the reorganisation of the Indian states.

Controversy
In September 2022, a college student from Sooranad committed suicide after the Kerala Bank pasted attachment notice indicating defaulting on loan repayment in front of her house.

References

Banks based in Kerala
2019 establishments in Kerala
Banks established in 2019
Indian companies established in 2019